Hydra-Shok is a type of hollow-point projectile made by Federal Premium Ammunition. It was originally patented by ammunition designer Tom Burczynski. Hydra-Shok was released in 1988 after the FBI requested a bullet with better terminal ballistics than traditional cup and core projectiles.

Design
Hydra-Shok ammunition features a unique, patented center-post design and notched jacket with a non-bonded lead core. Together they are meant to provide more reliable expansion and deeper penetration than the other projectiles used at that time. Center post designed bullets like Hydra-Shok have more predictable results and therefore offer some advantage as a projectile.

The manufacturer says that the scored  jacket and center post design provide a "programmed" expansion. There has been much debate regarding the bullet's unreliable expansion when fired through clothing or media other than ballistic gelatin, in which the bullet typically displays very rapid expansion resulting in a larger but more shallow wound channel than would be typical from most other bullet configurations in the same caliber and of similar weight.

Calibers
The Hydra-Shok is available in various calibers; 9x19mm Parabellum, 10mm Auto, .32 ACP, .380 ACP, .38 S&W Special, .327 Federal Magnum, .357 S&W Magnum, .40 S&W, .45 ACP, .45 GAP, and .44 Remington Magnum. It can also be found in 12 gauge shotgun slugs.

References 

Ammunition